Grand Lake is a lake in the Ottawa River drainage basin in the Unorganized West Part of Timiskaming District in Northeastern Ontario, Canada.

The primary inflows are Wampus Creek at the southwest and an unnamed creek arriving from Fisher Lake at the west, and the primary outflow is also Wampus Creek at the northeast, which flows via the West Montreal River, the Montreal River and Lake Timiskaming to the Ottawa River.

References

Lakes of Timiskaming District